Martin Macho (born 23 January 1998) is a Slovak footballer who plays for FC Slovan Galanta as a midfielder.

Club career

FC Nitra
Macho made his professional debut for FC Nitra against MFK Ružomberok on February 26, 2018.

References

External links
 FC Nitra official club profile
 
 Futbalnet profile

1998 births
Living people
Slovak footballers
Association football midfielders
FC Nitra players
Slovak Super Liga players
Sportspeople from Nitra